This is a continued list of Nintendo Switch games.

List
There are currently  games across List of Nintendo Switch games (0–9 and A), List of Nintendo Switch games (B), List of Nintendo Switch games (C–G), this page (H–P), and List of Nintendo Switch games (Q–Z).

Notes

ЗылЙ

References

Switch
Nintendo Switch